New Milford is a fictional town in New Hampshire, United States. It was the subject of a hoax article published in 2010 by the White Pine Series of Architectural Monographs, which described the community as being a flourishing Victorian-era village in the White Mountains during the early 20th century. According to the article, New Milford had been incorporated in 1852 by working-class quarry workers, had enjoyed prosperity for many years, and then declined in the early 20th century, following a succession of unfortunate disasters at the quarry site, the decline of rail-based tourism, the Great Depression, and the outbreak of World Wars. Research by the Milford, New Hampshire, Historical Society and the New Hampshire State Library following the publication of the article led to the discovery that the article was fictitious.

References

Fictional populated places in New Hampshire
Hoaxes